Why Lady Why is the second studio album by American country music artist Gary Morris. It was released on August 17, 1983 via Warner Bros. Records. The album includes the singles "Velvet Chains", "The Love She Found in Me", "The Wind Beneath My Wings" and "Why Lady Why", the album's title track.

Track listing

Personnel
Adapted from liner notes.

Acoustic Guitar: Dann Huff, Gary Morris, Brent Rowan, Billy Joe Walker Jr. Paul Worley, Reggie Young
Electric Guitar: Jamie Brantley, Bruce Dees, Kenny Mims, Gary Hooker, Billy Joe Walker Jr., Reggie Young
Bass Guitar: Steve Brantley, David Hungate, Joe Osborn, Bob Wray
Steel Guitar: John Macy, Sonny Garrish
Drums: Eddie Bayers, Matt Betton, Merel Bregante, James Stroud
Keyboards: Mitch Humphries, John Barlow Jarvis, Ron Oates
Fiddle: Hoot Hester
Lead Vocals: Gary Morris
Background Vocals: Jamie Brantley, Steve Brantley, Thom Flora, Gary Hooker, Gary Janney, Gary Morris, Gary Pigg, Mark Wright

Strings performed by The Nashville String Machine, arranged by Ron Oates and Al De Lory.

Chart performance

References

1983 albums
Gary Morris albums
Albums produced by Jimmy Bowen
Albums produced by Bob Montgomery (songwriter)
Albums produced by Paul Worley
Warner Records albums